is a baseball game developed by Genki and published by Imagineer for the Nintendo 64. It was released only in Japan in 1996 and has a sequel, Chōkūkan Night Pro Yakyū King 2.

Notes

References

External links

Nippon Professional Baseball video games
Nintendo 64 games
Japan-exclusive video games
1996 video games
Genki (company) games
Imagineer games
Nintendo 64-only games
Multiplayer and single-player video games
Video games developed in Japan